Jevrić is a South Slavic surname. Notable people with the surname include:

Adrian Jevrić, German footballer
Darinka Jevrić
Dragoslav Jevrić, Serbian footballer
Ekrem Jevrić
Olga Jevrić
Dušan Jevrić, Serbian football manager

South Slavic-language surnames